A list of books and essays about Mario Monicelli:

Monicelli, Mario